The General Conference Session is the official world meeting of the General Conference of Seventh-day Adventists,  held every five years. At the session, delegates from around the world elect the Church's World Leaders, discuss and vote on changes to the Church's Constitution, and listen to reports from the Church's 13 Divisions on activities going on within its territory.

The first session was held on May 20, 1863 in Battle Creek, Michigan with 20 delegates in attendance. The early sessions were held every year in a small church. As the Church's membership grew, time between sessions lengthened, meeting places got bigger, and more delegates attended. Today the sessions are held every five years in cities with stadiums that can seat more than 70,000 attendees, which includes the more than 2,400 delegates attending and the visitors from around the world who are watching the session.

List of sessions

See also 
 General Conference of Seventh-day Adventists
 1888 Minneapolis General Conference
 Seventh-day Adventist Church
 History of the Seventh-day Adventist Church

External links 
 GCSession.org
 General Conference Session Bulletins from Adventist Archives

References 

 
Quinquennial events